Over the Range: Sunshine and Shadow in the Kimberley is a 1937 book by Ion Idriess about life in the Kimberley region in Western Australia.

Idriess records his experiences while accompanying a Nor'-west Mounted Police Patrol for twelve hundred miles through the Kimberleys, north of the Wunaamin-Miliwundi Ranges. Between 1879 and 2020 the ranges were known as King Leopold Ranges.

Reception
Ten thousand copies were sold in the first ten days, establishing an Australian record.

References

External links
Over the Range at AustLit

1937 non-fiction books
Kimberley (Western Australia)
Australian non-fiction books
Books by Ion Idriess
Angus & Robertson books